Beit Liqya is a Palestinian town located in the Ramallah and al-Bireh Governorate in the northern West Bank. According to the Palestinian Central Bureau of Statistics, it had a population of approximately 7,710 in 2007, of whom 3,799 were male and 3,911 were female.

Location
Beit Liqya is located 13.5 km southwest of Ramallah. It is bordered by Beit ‘Anan  and Beit ‘Ur al Foqa  to the east, Kharbatha al Misbah to the north, Beit Sira and Beit Nuba to the west, and Beit Nuba and Kharayib Umm al Lahim to the south.

History
However, later researchers have suggested Tel Shalaf, north of Ge'alya as the location of Eltekeh.

Medieval period 
In the early 1200, the revenues from Beit Liqya were given as a waqf designated for the Al-Haram al-Sharif.

Ottoman era
Beit Liqya, like the rest of Palestine, was incorporated into the Ottoman Empire in 1517, and in 1557 the revenues of the village were designated for the new waqf of Hasseki Sultan Imaret in Jerusalem, established by Hasseki Hurrem Sultan (Roxelana), the wife of Suleiman the Magnificent.

In 1838 Beit Lukia was noted as a Muslim village, located in the Beni Malik area, west of Jerusalem.

The French explorer Victor Guérin visited the village in the 1863, and estimated that it had around five hundred inhabitants. He also noted a wali for a Sheikh Abou Ismail. An official Ottoman village list from about 1870, showed that "Bet Lukja" had a total of 109 houses and a population of 347, though the population count included only men.

In 1883, the PEF's Survey of Western Palestine described Beit Likia as a "small village on a main road at the foot of the hills, supplied by cisterns. There are ancient foundations among the houses."

British Mandate era
In the 1922 census of Palestine conducted by the British Mandate authorities, Beit Leqia had a population of 739, all Muslim, increasing by the time of 1931 census, when Beit Liqya had 209 occupied houses and a population of 858, still all Muslim.

In the 1945 statistics the population was 1,040, all Muslims, while the total land area was 14,358 dunams, according to an official land and population survey. Of this, 1,918  were allocated for plantations and irrigable land, 6,469 for cereals, while 39 dunams were classified as built-up (urban) areas.

Jordanian era
In the wake of the 1948 Arab–Israeli War, and after the 1949 Armistice Agreements, Beit Liqya came  under Jordanian rule.

In 1961, the population of Beit Liqya was 1,727.

Post-1967
Since the Six-Day War in 1967, Beit Liqya has been under Israeli occupation.

After the 1995 accords, 10.4% of the land of Beit Liqya was classified as Area B, the remaining 89.6% as Area C.

Jamal 'Asi (15 years old) and U'dai 'Asi (14 years old) were killed by the Israeli Army in 2005 near the Israeli West Bank barrier. UN Secretary-General Kofi Annan welcomed Israel's announcement that an involved IDF officer was suspended, and that a full investigation of the incident would take place.

Later the same year, their 15-year-old cousin Mahyoub al-Asi was killed by a civilian security guard, "whom he knew." He was tending the family vineyard. His brother was also killed by a mine explosion near the village several years ago.

On October 16, 2014, Israeli forces shot and killed the 13-year-old Palestinian boy Bahaa Badr in the village near the dividing line with Israel. Bahaa Badr was shot in the chest and died 20 minutes after arriving at the hospital.

References

Bibliography

 (pp. 4,8,16,58)

External links
Welcome To Bayt Liqya
 Beit Liqya Town (Fact Sheet),  Applied Research Institute–Jerusalem (ARIJ)
 Beit Liqya Town Profile, ARIJ
 Beit Liqya  aerial photo, ARIJ
Locality Development Priorities and Needs in Beit Liqya Town, ARIJ 
Survey of Western Palestine, Map 17:  IAA, Wikimedia commons 
A New Israeli Military Order to confiscate ten dunums of Beit Liqya lands southwest of Ramallah city  24, April, 2010, AIRJ

Towns in the West Bank
Ramallah and al-Bireh Governorate
Municipalities of the State of Palestine